The Sikorsky Russky Vityaz, or Russian Knight (S-21), previously known as the Bolshoi Baltisky (The Great Baltic) in its first four-engined version, was the first four-engine aircraft in the world, designed by Igor Sikorsky and built at the Russian Baltic Railroad Car Works (Russo-Baltiiskyi Vagonnyi Zavod or R-BVZ) in Saint Petersburg in early 1913.

Development
On hearing about the construction of the Russky Vityaz in early 1913, the experts and the media around the world were predicting a complete failure. The first aerial test of the Russky Vityaz on 10 May 1913 was successful. At the time, many people in other parts of the world considered it to be a newspaper hoax, and did not believe it. Observers believed that an aircraft of such dimensions would never leave the ground.

Design
The Russky Vityaz was a four-engine multi-bay biplane with unequal-span wings. The distance between the wings (wing gap) was also . Its fuselage was a rectangular section girder, covered with plywood sheets. The aircraft had a cabin with dual control columns, two passenger cabins and a storage room for spare parts. There was also an open deck forward of the pilot's cabin equipped with a searchlight and machine gun. The ailerons on the upper wings provided for the airplane's stability. The first quadruple-engined version of what was to become known as the Russky Vityaz, originally known as the Bolshoi Baltisky (Great Baltic), was powered by four engines installed in tandem pairs (it was originally designed as a twin-engine plane, known as "Le Grand"). The Russky Vityaz relocated the twin pusher engines from the Bolshoi Baltisky's layout onto the leading edge of the lower wing as tractor configuration powerplants, outboard of the original inner tractor configuration engines.

Sikorsky described the airplane's instruments, "There were four tachometers for the engines, two altimeters, a U-glass tube with alcohol connected to a sort of pressure receiver to indicate the flying speed, a ball in a curved glass tube to work as bank indicator and a long streamline tube mounted some three feet ahead of the window with divisions to indicate the incidence. The three latter instruments were 'home made,' designed for the 'Grand.' They were particularly necessary because of the enclosed cabin."

Operational history
After the Russky Vityaz's first test flights between 10 and 27 May 1913 O.S., it was established that a passenger could even walk around the cabins without causing any problems to stability. The aircraft left the ground after a  takeoff run.

After the first test flight with his co-pilot and mechanic on board, Sikorsky noted, "in order to keep the engines close to the center line, they were mounted in two tandem groups on both sides of the fuselage. This was done chiefly to protect the plane from the danger of unsymmetrical thrust if one of the outer engines should stop." However, this configuration resulted in poor take-off and climb performance, due to propeller inefficiency.  In June 1913, the airplane was altered so that the two rear engines were remounted outboard on the leading edges, "...transforming the installation into a four-in-line.  The change resulted in a substantially improved take-off and a slightly better climb  The rudders were still effective enough to hold the plane against two engines stopped on one side."  On 2 August Sikorsky flew the "Grand" for one hour and fifty-four minutes with eight persons on board.  Sikorsky made a total of fifty-three flights with the "Grand" before it was damaged by falling debris from a different aircraft.

Sikorsky's aspirations for the Russky Vityaz proved to be short-lived. While parked on the runway on 23 June 1913, the aircraft was crushed by an engine that fell off a single-seat Morane-Saulnier aircraft during a landing. Sikorsky decided not to repair the seriously damaged Russky Vityaz and began working on his next brainchild — the Ilya Muromets.

Specifications (Russky Vityaz)

References

External links

  Detailed description with plan drawings. Basically a translation of the German article "Der Doppeldecker von Sykorsky" below.
 
 
 
 
 World’s first four-engine airplane Russky Vityaz: the Era of Sykorsky 
 Vladimir Bykov, Авиалайнеры мира ("Airliners of the World") – Сикорский С-21 Русский Витязь (Sikorsky S-21 Russky Vityaz) (in Russian)

1910s Russian experimental aircraft
Aircraft first flown in 1913
Biplanes
Four-engined piston aircraft
Four-engined tractor aircraft
RBVZ aircraft
Russky Vityaz